Neoteny, also called juvenilization, is the delaying or slowing of the physiological, or somatic, development of an organism, typically an animal. Neoteny is found in modern humans compared to other primates. In progenesis or paedogenesis, sexual development is accelerated.
 
Both neoteny and progenesis result in paedomorphism (as having the form typical of children) or paedomorphosis (changing towards forms typical of children), a type of heterochrony. It is the retention in adults of traits previously seen only in the young. Such retention is important in evolutionary biology, domestication and evolutionary developmental biology. Some authors define paedomorphism as the retention of larval traits, as seen in salamanders.

History and etymology 

The origins of the concept of neoteny have been traced to the Bible (as argued by Ashley Montagu) and to the poet William Wordsworth's "The Child is the father of the Man" (as argued by Barry Bogin). The term itself was invented in 1885 by Julius Kollmann as he described the axolotl's maturation while remaining in a tadpole-like aquatic stage complete with gills, unlike other adult amphibians like frogs and toads.

The word neoteny is borrowed from the German Neotenie, the latter constructed by Kollmann from the Greek νέος (neos, "young") and τείνειν (teínein, "to stretch, to extend"). The adjective is either "neotenic" or "neotenous". For the opposite of "neotenic", different authorities use either "gerontomorphic" or "peramorphic". Bogin points out that Kollmann had intended the meaning to be "retaining youth", but had evidently confused the Greek teínein with the Latin tenere, which had the meaning he wanted, "to retain", so that the new word would mean "the retaining of youth (into adulthood)".

In 1926, Louis Bolk described neoteny as the major process in humanization. In his 1977 book Ontogeny and Phylogeny, Stephen Jay Gould noted that Bolk's account constituted an attempted justification for "scientific" racism and sexism, but acknowledged that Bolk had been right in the core idea that humans differ from other primates in becoming sexually mature in an infantile stage of body development.

In humans 

Neoteny in humans is the slowing or delaying of body development, compared to non-human primates, resulting in features such as a large head, a flat face, and relatively short arms. These neotenic changes may have been brought about by sexual selection in human evolution. In turn, they may have permitted the development of human capacities such as emotional communication. However, humans also have relatively large noses and long legs, both peramorphic (not neotenic) traits. Some evolutionary theorists have proposed that neoteny was a key feature in human evolution.  J. B. S. Haldane states a "major evolutionary trend in human beings" is "greater prolongation of childhood and retardation of maturity." Delbert D. Thiessen said that "neoteny becomes more apparent as early primates evolved into later forms" and that primates have been "evolving toward flat face." Doug Jones argued that human evolution's trend toward neoteny may have been caused by sexual selection in human evolution for neotenous facial traits in women by men with the resulting neoteny in male faces being a "by-product" of sexual selection for neotenous female faces.

In domestic animals 

Neoteny is seen in domesticated animals such as dogs and mice. This is because there are more resources available, less competition for those resources, and with the lowered competition the animals expend less energy obtaining those resources. This allows them to mature and reproduce more quickly than their wild counterparts. The environment that domesticated animals are raised in determines whether or not neoteny is present in those animals. Evolutionary neoteny can arise in a species when those conditions occur, and a species becomes sexually mature ahead of its "normal development". Another explanation for the neoteny in domesticated animals can be the selection for certain behavioral characteristics. Behavior is linked to genetics which therefore means that when a behavioral trait is selected for, a physical trait may also be selected for due to mechanisms like linkage disequilibrium. Often, juvenile behaviors are selected for in order to more easily domesticate a species; aggressiveness in certain species comes with adulthood when there is a need to compete for resources. If there is no need for competition, then there is no need for aggression. Selecting for juvenile behavioral characteristics can lead to neoteny in physical characteristics because, for example, with the reduced need for behaviors like aggression, there is no need for developed traits that would help in that area. Traits that may become neotenized due to decreased aggression may be a shorter muzzle and smaller general size among the domesticated individuals. Some common neotenous physical traits in domesticated animals (mainly dogs, pigs, ferrets, cats, and even foxes) include floppy ears, changes in the reproductive cycle, curly tails, piebald coloration, fewer or shortened vertebra, large eyes, rounded forehead, large ears, and shortened muzzle.

When the role of dogs expanded from just being working dogs to also being companions, humans started selective breeding dogs for morphological neoteny, and this selective breeding for "neoteny or paedomorphism" "strengthened the human-canine bond." Humans bred dogs to have more "juvenile physical traits" as adults, such as short snouts and wide-set eyes which are associated with puppies because people usually consider these traits to be more attractive. Some breeds of dogs with short snouts and broad heads such as the Komondor, Saint Bernard and Maremma Sheepdog are more morphologically neotenous than other breeds of dogs. Cavalier King Charles spaniels are an example of selection for neoteny because they exhibit large eyes, pendant-shaped ears and compact feet, giving them a morphology similar to puppies as adults.

In 2004, a study that used 310 wolf skulls and over 700 dog skulls representing 100 breeds concluded that the evolution of dog skulls can generally not be described by heterochronic processes such as neoteny, although some pedomorphic dog breeds have skulls that resemble the skulls of juvenile wolves. By 2011, the findings by the same researcher were simply "Dogs are not paedomorphic wolves."

In other species 

Neoteny has been observed in many other species. It is important to note the difference between partial and full neoteny when looking at other species, to distinguish between juvenile traits which are advantageous in the short term and traits which are beneficial throughout the organism's life; this might provide insight into the cause of neoteny in a species. Partial neoteny is the retention of the larval form beyond the usual age of maturation, with possible sexual development (progenesis) and eventual maturation into the adult form; this is seen in the frog Lithobates clamitans. Full neoteny is seen in Ambystoma mexicanum and some populations of Ambystoma tigrinum, which remain in larval form throughout their lives. Lithobates clamitans is partially neotenous; it delays maturation during the winter as fewer resources are available; it can find resources more easily in its larval form. This encompasses both of the main causes of neoteny; the energy required to survive in the winter as a newly-formed adult is too great, so the organism exhibits neotenous characteristics until it can better survive as an adult. Ambystoma tigrinum retains its neoteny for a similar reason; however, the retention is permanent due to the lack of available resources throughout its lifetime. This is another example of an environmental cause of neoteny. Several avian species, such as the manakins Chiroxiphia linearis and Chiroxiphia caudata, exhibit partial neoteny. The males of both species retain juvenile plumage into adulthood, losing it when they are fully mature. In some bird species, the retention of juvenile plumage is linked to the molting time in each species. To ensure no overlap between molting and mating times, the birds may exhibit partial neoteny in plumage; males do not attain their bright, adult plumage before the females are prepared to mate. Neoteny is present because there is no need for the males to molt early, and trying to mate with immature females would be energy-inefficient.

Neoteny is commonly seen in flightless insects, such as the females of the order Strepsiptera. Flightlessness in insects has evolved separately a number of times; factors which may have contributed to the separate evolution of flightlessness are high altitude, geographic isolation (islands), and low temperatures. Under these environmental conditions, dispersal would be disadvantageous; heat is lost more rapidly through wings in colder climates. The  females of certain insect groups become sexually mature without metamorphosis, and some do not develop wings. Flightlessness in some female insects has been linked to higher fecundity. Aphids are an example of insects which may never develop wings, depending on their environment. If resources are abundant on a host plant, there is no need to grow wings and disperse. If resources become diminished, their offspring may develop wings to disperse to other host plants.

Two environments which favor neoteny are high altitudes and cool temperatures, because neotenous individuals have more fitness than individuals which metamorphose into an adult form. The energy required for metamorphosis detracts from individual fitness, and neotenous individuals can utilize available resources more easily. This trend is seen in a comparison of salamander species at lower and higher altitudes; in a cool, high-altitude environment, neotenous individuals survive more and are more fecund than those which metamorphose into adult form. Insects in cooler environments tend to exhibit neoteny in flight because wings have a high surface area and lose heat quickly; it is disadvantageous for insects to metamorphose into adults.

Many species of salamander, and amphibians in general, exhibit environmental neoteny. Axolotl and olm are salamander species which retain their juvenile aquatic form throughout adulthood, examples of full neoteny. Gills are a common juvenile characteristic in amphibians which are kept after maturation; examples are the tiger salamander and rough-skinned newt, both of which retain gills into adulthood.

Bonobos share many physical characteristics with humans, including neotenous skulls. The shape of their skull does not change into adulthood (only increasing in size), due to sexual dimorphism and an evolutionary change in the timing of development. Juveniles became sexually mature before their bodies had fully developed as adults and, due to a selective advantage, the skull's neotenic structure remained.

In some groups, such as the insect families Gerridae, Delphacidae and Carabidae, energy costs result in neoteny; many species in these families have  small, neotenous wings or  none at all. Some cricket species shed their wings in adulthood; in the genus Ozopemon, males (thought to be the first example of neoteny in beetles) are significantly smaller than females due to inbreeding. In the termite Kalotermes flavicollis, neoteny is seen in molting females.

In other species, such as the northwestern salamander (Ambystoma gracile), environmental conditionshigh altitude, in this casecause neoteny. Neoteny is also found in a few species of the crustacean family Ischnomesidae, which live in deep ocean water.

Subcellular neoteny 

Neoteny is usually used to describe animal development; however, neoteny is also seen in the cell organelles. It was suggested that subcellular neoteny could explain why sperm cells have atypical centrioles. One of the two sperm centrioles of fruit fly exhibit the retention of “juvenile” centriole structure, which can be described as centriolar “neoteny”. This neotenic, atypical centriole is known as the Proximal Centriole-Like. Typical centrioles form via a step by step process in which a cartwheel forms, then develops to become a procentriole, and further matures into a centriole. The neotenic centriole of fruit fly resembles an early procentriole.

See also 

 Ageing
 Cuteness
 Kawaii
 Larviform female
 Neotenin

References

Further reading 

 Bergstorm, Carl T. & Dugatkin, Lee Alan (2012). Evolution, W.W. Norton

External links 

 

Developmental biology
Evolutionary biology
Taxonomy (biology)